The  was the main gate built in the center of the south end of the imperial palaces in the Japanese ancient capitals of Fujiwara-kyō (Kashihara), Heijō-kyō (Nara), and later Heian-kyō (Kyoto). The placement followed the ancient Chinese palace model requirements at the time, where , the Vermilion Bird was the Guardian of the South. (See Four Symbols for more.)

It was said to be the site where foreign dignitaries were received by the Emperor. All of them were destroyed centuries ago along with the old imperial residences.

Nara Suzakumon 
In 1993, it was decided that the gate of Nara would be reconstructed. It proved extremely difficult to work out what Suzakumon had looked like, as there were no surviving structural remnants. A conjectural model was developed, based on comparable architecture elsewhere, and the new gate was constructed from a mixture of traditional building materials (cypress wood and tiles) and concrete, in order to resist earthquakes. The reconstructed gate was opened in 1998.

Most of the gate was constructed by the Takenaka Corporation.

See also 
 Heijō Palace
 Rashōmon in Kyoto

References

External links 

 Nara Palace Site Museum

Gates in Japan
Buildings and structures in Nara Prefecture